The Cartagena Declaration on Refugees, or just Cartagena Declaration, is a non-binding regional, i.e. Latin-American, instrument for the protection of refugees and was adopted in 1984 by delegates from 10 Latin-American countries: Belize, Colombia, Costa Rica, El Salvador, Guatemala, Honduras, Mexico, Nicaragua, Panama and Venezuela. The Declaration has since been incorporated into the national laws and state practices of 14 countries.

The declaration is the result of the "Colloquium on International Protection for Refugees and Displaced Persons in Central America, Mexico and Panama", which was held in Cartagena, Colombia from 19 to 22 November 1984. The Declaration was influenced by the "Contadora Act on Peace and Cooperation", which itself was based on the 1951 Refugee Convention and the 1967 Protocol.

The Declaration reaffirms the importance of the right to asylum, the principle of non-refoulement and the importance of finding durable solutions.

Impact

Extended refugee definition 
Compared to the 1951 Convention and the 1967 Protocol the Cartagena Declaration allows a broader category of persons in need of international protection to be considered as refugees. The Declaration, in Conclusion III, adds five situational events to the definition of the 1951 Convention and the 1967 Protocol. Similar additions were made in the 1969 Refugee Convention, but the Cartagena Declaration has further extended them. Refugees are those:

 "persons who have fled their country because their lives, security or freedom have been threatened by generalized violence, foreign aggression, internal conflicts, massive violation of human rights or other circumstances which have seriously disturbed public order".

This definition allows a broader temporal and geographical scope for the risks refugees find themselves in and additionally covers some of the indirect effects such as poverty, economic decline, inflation, violence, disease, food insecurity, malnourishment and displacement.

Improved cooperation between countries 

The Cartagena Declaration was the beginning of an ongoing forum between Latin American countries. Since 1984 the signatories of the declaration meet again every 10 years and they have even extended its reach to include Caribbean countries. Three successor declarations were made: the 1994 San José Declaration, the 2004 Mexico Declaration and the 2014 Brazil Declaration (with 28 countries and three territories of Latin America and the Caribbean). No other continent or region has such a forum.

First Application of the Cartagena Declaration 

On 24 July 2019, Brazil applied the criteria in the expanded definition of a refugee as set forth by the Cartagena Declaration on Refugees to accept the petitions for refugee cases by 174 Venezuelans. The UNHCR praised Brazil for this significant advancement for the protection of Venezuelans forced to leave their country.

The decision was made possible by the National Refugee Committee’s (CONARE) recognition. On 14 June, the Committee recognized that there is an objective situation of serious and widespread violation of human rights in Venezuela. The decision enables the over 100,000 refugee status petitions to begin to be processed for asylum in Brazil.

As of 6 December 2019, the decision by Brazil’s National Committee for Refugees (CONARE) on Thursday to accept asylum-seekers on a prima facie basis, gave immediate relief to around 21,000 Venezuelans, waiting for applications to be processed.

The Brazilian government continues to respond to the terms of the Cartagena Declaration, particularly with innovative efforts of refugee integration - such as the Chair Commission for Sergio Viera de Mello "Catedra Sérgio Viera de Mello" (CSVM) -  providing, open and generous ways to support refugee socio-economic inclusion as part Section III.6 of the Cartagena Declaration.

References

Human rights instruments
Refugees in North America
Right of asylum in North America
Right of asylum in South America
Refugees in South America
1984 in law